The 1961 Liège–Bastogne–Liège was the 47th edition of the Liège–Bastogne–Liège cycle race and was held on 15 May 1961. The race started and finished in Liège. The race was won by Rik Van Looy of the Faema team.

General classification

References

1961
1961 in Belgian sport